Descendants of Cain:
according to Genesis:
Enoch, 
Irad, 
Mehujael, 
Methushael, 
Lamech, 
Jabal/Jubal/Tubal-cain
in Beowulf: Grendel, Grendel's mother

See also 
Descendants of Cain (film), a 1968 Korean film
The Descendants of Cain, a Korean novel
Descendants of Cain (album), an album by Ka
Culture hero
Tribes of Caïn

Cain